Mustafa Kërçuku (born in Kavajë) served as Albania's Auditor General from 1997–2004. He was elected to his post as a candidate from the National Front party.

References

Institution heads from Kavajë
State auditors of Albania
Living people
Year of birth missing (living people)